Forest Eyes is an album by saxophonist Stan Getz featuring compositions by Jurre Haanstra, several of which featured in Bert Haanstra's film "Een Pak Slaag", which was recorded in 1979 and originally released on the Dutch CBS label.

Reception

The Allmusic review by Scott Yanow stated "The great tenor is in his usual professional form but none of the themes are all that memorable and his backing is pretty anonymous. It's not one of the essential Stan Getz albums". Doug Payne observed "Getz is typically lovely from start to finish. But brief as it is, Forest Eyes sadly never offers that one compositional moment that makes you feel this is anywhere near as significant as something like Focus".

Track listing
All compositions by Jurre Haanstra.
 "We Are Free" - 5:11
 "Tails - Part 1 & 2" - 6:00
 "Shades of Blue (Main Theme from the Bert Haanstra Film "Een Pak Slaag")" - 3:14
 "Heron's Flight" - 4:02
 "Forest Eyes" - 3:20
 "Drowsy" - 4:07
 "Silva (From the Film "Een Pak Slaag")" - 3:30
 "Little Lady" - 4:00
 "Eye of the Storm (From the Film "Een Pak Slaag")" - 2:52

Personnel 
Stan Getz - tenor saxophone
Jurre Haanstra - drums, percussion, piano, electric piano, arranger, conductor
Unidentified orchestra  - Benny Behr - concertmaster
Rob van Kreeveld - piano, electric piano (tracks 1, 3, 4 & 5)
Rob Franken - electric piano (track 2)
Peter Schön - synthesizer (tracks 6 & 8)
Henk Braaf (tracks 2 & 8), Chuck Loeb (track 6) - guitar
Jan Hollestelle (track 6), Koos Serierse (tracks 1, 3, 4, & 5) - bass 
Paul Bagmeyer - bass guitar (tracks 2 & 8)
Victor Jones (track 6) - drums 
Willy Tjon Ajong - percussion, electric piano (tracks 6 & 8)

References 

1980 albums
Stan Getz albums
CBS Records albums